Kattegatruten is a Danish company that operated a passenger and freight service across the Kattegat.

The company began operations in September 2011 following Mols-Linien withdrawing from the Aarhus - Kalundborg route. This route was suspended in October 2013.

Routes
Kattegatruten operated one route across the Kattegat from 2011 to 2013.

Aarhus - Kalundborg

References

Ferry companies of Denmark